Vanja Milinković-Savić (born 20 February 1997) is a Serbian professional footballer who plays as a goalkeeper for Serie A club Torino. Born in Spain, he represents the Serbia national team. His elder brother Sergej plays for Lazio. 

After failing to be awarded a UK work permit with English club Manchester United, he was released by the club in November 2015 and signed a contract with Lechia Gdańsk. In 2017 he was signed by Torino.

Club career
On 2 April 2014, Milinković-Savić signed his first professional contract with Vojvodina, penning a three-year deal. On 17 May 2014, it was announced by Manchester United that the club reached an agreement with Vojvodina for the transfer of Milinković-Savić. Both clubs agreed that the player would stay with Vojvodina for one more season. The deal was completed on 5 August 2014, for a transfer fee of €1.75 million.

Milinković-Savić made his competitive debut for Vojvodina on 10 August 2014, keeping a clean sheet in a 3–0 home league victory over OFK Beograd. He played the full 90 minutes in all 15 league games in the first part of the 2014–15 season. After the winter break, Milinković-Savić lost his place as first-choice goalkeeper to experienced Srđan Žakula, making only two more league appearances.

After failing to earn a work permit to play in England, Milinković-Savić was released by Manchester United in November 2015 and he signed a four-and-a-half-year contract with Polish club Lechia Gdańsk on 26 November; the contract commenced on 1 January 2016.

On 30 January 2017, Italian club Torino announced they had purchased him and he would join the club on 1 July. He was the first-choice goalkeeper for the national cup, while being the second choice, behind Salvatore Sirigu, for the Serie A. During the Coppa Italia match against Carpi, he hit the crossbar with a free-kick in injury time.

On 6 July 2018, Milinković-Savić signed with S.P.A.L. on loan from Torino until 30 June 2019.

On 31 January 2019, Milinković-Savić joined to Serie B side Ascoli on loan until 30 June 2019.

On 29 June 2019, he joined to Belgian club Standard Liège on loan with an option to buy.

On 15 June 2021, Torino announced a contract extension until 30 June 2024.

International career
Milinković-Savić was selected to represent the Serbia U19 national team at the 2014 UEFA Under-19 Championship. He served as a backup to Predrag Rajković, failing to make an appearance at the tournament, as the team was eliminated by Portugal on penalties in the semi-finals of the competition.

Milinković-Savić again served as a backup to Rajković at the 2015 FIFA U-20 World Cup, where the Serbian team won the gold medal.

He made his debut for the senior national team on 11 November 2021 in a friendly against Qatar.

In November 2022, he was selected in Serbia's squad for the 2022 FIFA World Cup in Qatar. He played in all three group stage matches, against Brazil, Cameroon, and Switzerland. Serbia finished fourth in the group.

Personal life
Milinković-Savić was born in Orense, Spain, to parents Nikola Milinković, who was playing professional football for CD Ourense, and Milana Savić, a professional basketball player. He is the younger brother of midfielder Sergej Milinković-Savić.

Career statistics

Club

International

Honours
Serbia U20
FIFA U-20 World Cup: 2015

References

External links
 
 
 
 

1997 births
Living people
Footballers from Ourense
Serbian footballers
Serbia international footballers
Serbia under-21 international footballers
Serbia youth international footballers
Spanish footballers
Spanish people of Serbian descent
Association football goalkeepers
FK Vojvodina players
Manchester United F.C. players
Serbian SuperLiga players
Serie A players
Serie B players
Ekstraklasa players
Belgian Pro League players
Lechia Gdańsk players
Torino F.C. players
S.P.A.L. players
Ascoli Calcio 1898 F.C. players
Standard Liège players
Serbian expatriate footballers
Spanish expatriate footballers
Spanish expatriate sportspeople in Poland 
Spanish expatriate sportspeople in Belgium
Spanish expatriate sportspeople in England
Spanish expatriate sportspeople in Italy 
Serbian expatriate sportspeople in England
Serbian expatriate sportspeople in Italy
Serbian expatriate sportspeople in Poland
Serbian expatriate sportspeople in Belgium
Expatriate footballers in England 
Expatriate footballers in Poland
Expatriate footballers in Italy
Expatriate footballers in Belgium
2022 FIFA World Cup players